The Czech Republic originally planned to participate in the Eurovision Song Contest 2020 with the song "Kemama" written by Osama Verse-Atile, Ben Cristóvão, Charles Sarpong and Rudy Ray. The song was performed by Benny Cristo, which is the artistic name of singer Ben Cristóvão. The Czech broadcaster Česká televize (ČT) organised the national final Eurovision Song CZ 2020 in order to select the Czech entry for the 2020 contest in Rotterdam, Netherlands. Seven entries competed in the national final and "Kemama" performed by Benny Cristo was announced as the winner on 3 February 2020 following the combination of votes from an eleven-member international jury panel and a public vote.

Czech Republic was drawn to compete in the second semi-final of the Eurovision Song Contest which took place on 14 May 2020. However, the contest was cancelled due to the COVID-19 pandemic.

Background 

The nation competed in the contest on three consecutive occasions between 2007 and 2009 without qualifying to the final: in 2007 Kabát performing "Malá dáma" placed 28th (last) in the semi-final achieving only one point, in 2008 Tereza Kerndlová performing "Have Some Fun" placed 18th (second to last) in her semi-final scoring nine points and in 2009 Gipsy.cz performing the song "Aven Romale" placed 18th (last) in their semi-final failing to score any points. The Czech broadcaster withdrew from the contest between 2010 and 2014 citing reasons such as low viewing figures and poor results for their absence. Since returning to the contest in 2015 and qualifying to the final for the first time in 2016, Czech Republic has featured in three finals. In 2019, the country qualified to the final placing 11th with Lake Malawi and the song "Friend of a Friend".

The Czech national broadcaster, Česká televize (ČT), broadcasts the event within Czech Republic and organises the selection process for the nation's entry. The broadcaster has used both national finals and internal selections to select the Czech Eurovision entry in the past. ČT confirmed their intentions to participate at the 2020 Eurovision Song Contest in January 2019, while also confirming that the Czech entry for the 2020 contest would be selected through a national final.

Before Eurovision

Eurovision Song CZ 2020
Eurovision Song CZ 2020 was the national final organised by ČT in order to select the Czech entry for the Eurovision Song Contest 2020. Eight entries participated in the competition which took place online between 20 January and 2 February 2020, with the winner being selected via a jury and public vote and announced on 3 February 2020.

Competing entries 
Artists and composers were able to submit their proposals to the broadcaster between 31 August 2018 and 31 October 2018. Artists were required to have Czech citizenship and for groups of a maximum of six members, at least one of the lead vocalists were required to have Czech citizenship. Songwriters of any nationality were able to submit songs. The broadcaster received 152 submissions at the closing of the deadline, of which 72 were written by Czech songwriters. A five-member jury consisting of creative director of the Czech Eurovision Song Contest delegation Jan Potměšil, Czech Head of Delegation for the Eurovision Song Contest Jan Bors, Head of Press for the Czech Eurovision Song Contest delegation Kryštof Šámal, Austrian choreographer Marvin Dietmann and Czech Deputy Head of Delegation for the Eurovision Song Contest Cyril Hirsch shortlisted 20 entries from the submissions received and selected eight entries for the national final, three to four of them through an audition round held on 27 and 28 August 2018 at the Studio A of ČT that featured 12 potential entries. 

On 2 December 2019, ČT announced that one of the entries had been withdrawn from the national final, and the remaining seven entries were announced during a press conference on 13 January 2020. Among the competing artists were Barbora Mochowa and Pam Rabbit, both of them which competed in previous editions of Eurovision Song CZ.

Final
Seven entries competed in the national final and the winner was determined by the combination of votes from an eleven-member international jury panel and a public vote held via the official Eurovision Song Contest application between 20 January and 2 February 2020. The international jury consisted of ten former Eurovision entrants, while both international and Czech users were able to vote via the app. Votes from users in the Czech Republic were counted towards the public vote, while votes from international users were counted towards the jury vote and had a weighting equal to the votes of a single jury member. The winner, "Kemama" performed by Benny Cristo, was announced on 3 February 2020.

The international jury panel consisted of:

 Stig Rästa – represented  in 2015 (with Elina Born)
 Zalagasper – represented  in 2019
 Keiino – represented  in 2019
 Kristian Kostov – represented  in 2017
 Isaiah Firebrace – represented  in 2017
 Sebastian Rejman – represented  in 2019 (with Darude)
 Miki Núñez – represented  in 2019
 Kasia Moś – represented  in 2017
 Michela Pace – represented  in 2019
 Katerine Duska – represented  in 2019

Preparation 
Following the announcement of Benny Cristo as the winner of Eurovision Song CZ 2020, the singer revealed that a revamped version of "Kemama" would be produced in Kenya for the Eurovision Song Contest. The final version of the song was released on 10 March, but due to negative public feedback a second revamp was then produced and released on 16 March.

Promotion 
Benny Cristo specifically promoted "Kemama" as the Czech Eurovision entry on 15 February 2020 by performing the song during the second semi-final of the Ukrainian Eurovision national final.

At Eurovision 
According to Eurovision rules, all nations with the exceptions of the host country and the "Big Five" (France, Germany, Italy, Spain and the United Kingdom) are required to qualify from one of two semi-finals in order to compete for the final; the top ten countries from each semi-final progress to the final. The European Broadcasting Union (EBU) split up the competing countries into six different pots based on voting patterns from previous contests, with countries with favourable voting histories put into the same pot. On 28 January 2020, a special allocation draw was held which placed each country into one of the two semi-finals, as well as which half of the show they would perform in. The Czech Republic was placed into the second semi-final, to be held on 14 May 2020, and was scheduled to perform in the first half of the show. However, due to 2019-20 pandemic of Coronavirus, the contest was cancelled.

References

2020
Countries in the Eurovision Song Contest 2020
Eurovision